{{DISPLAYTITLE:C28H38O7}}
The molecular formula C28H38O7 (molar mass: 486.60 g/mol, exact mass: 486.2618 u) may refer to:

 Bongkrek acid, or bongkrekic acid
 Andrastin A